Granby is a town in southwestern Quebec, located east of Montreal. The population as of the Canada 2021 Census was 69,025. Granby is the seat of La Haute-Yamaska Regional County Municipality. It is the second most populated city in Estrie after Sherbrooke. The town is named after John Manners, Marquess of Granby; today it is most famous for the Granby Zoo and its landmark fountain of Lac Boivin.

History

The territory on which Granby is found was described as natural prairies and forests composed of ash, fir, maple, hemlock and birch, there was also a small swamp a kilometre and half uphill. The area was inhabited sporadically by nomadic First Nations.

In 1792, Loyalists were granted permission to colonize the Eastern Townships.  On January 29, 1803, the Executive Council of Quebec conceded the Township of Granby to Colonel Henry Caldwell and his 97 associates. John Horner, the first inhabitant who settled on the site of the current town arrived in 1813. Horner built a sawmill near the Yamaska River. Twelve years later, in 1825, he opened a general store with Richard Frost. Frost traced the official plans later that same year.

Granby became an incorporated municipality in 1816, and a town in 1971.

Field areas have been exploited for agricultural use and the North Yamaska river's flow has been used for its hydraulic energy since the construction of a first dam in 1815 by large industrial companies; the use of dams along the stream has provoked the formation of a large shallow swamp, called Lac Boivin, often cited as one of Granby's landmarks.

In May 2006, the citizens of Granby and Granby Township held a referendum on a possible merger. A majority of citizens of the two municipalities approved the merger, which took effect on January 1, 2007.

Geography
Granby is a flat region located approximately halfway between Montreal and Sherbrooke along Autoroute 10; historically a land covered by forests and prairies, it has transformed into an urbanized core surrounded by fields and suburban neighborhoods. The North Yamaska river, which crosses lake Boivin (this lake took shape after the construction of a series of dams and later changed into a large swamp praised for its biodiversity. It connects to nearby villages by a network of roads and has two access points from the highway at exit 68 (through Saint-Alphonse-de-Granby) and 74 (via Bromont).

Parks and green spaces 

Granby has many parks and fountains, including the Daniel-Johnson, Victoria, Terry Fox, Miner, Pelletier, and Kennedy parks.
 Lake Boivin, Daniel-Johnson park, and the Centre d'interprétation de la nature du lac Boivin (nature interpretation centre of lake Boivin), take shape in the 1980s, landscaped with paths all around for bikers and pedestrians, they become a haven for all lovers of nature for they harbour many lifeforms. Touching the heart of the town, lake Boivin has park Daniel-Johnson on its northern shores, from which citizens and tourists practice recreational sports such as navigation and cycling, the park also hosts events for Saint-Jean-Baptiste and Earth day; as well as a self-proclaimed fête de la rivière (river festival) to honour and clean the North Yamaska River; characteristic hills on the park's premises are very popular for picnicking during the summer and sleighing in the winter. The Centre d'interprétation de la nature du lac Boivin is a non-profit devoted to conservation of the territory, habitat, fauna and flora of lake Boivin. 
 Yamaska National Park is a vast protected humid zone around the Choinière reservoir with forest, beach, walking and biking paths, as well as navigable waters (only light non-motorized vehicles are permitted); it is an important bird sanctuary.
 Park Victoria is the oldest urban garden in town. Purchased in 1889, and park landscaped in 1900, its name honours Queen Victoria (1876-1901). There are war memorials to Latimer (1901), for the soldiers killed in the Second Boer Wars, and the monument to the Braves, both accompanied by canons. Selbach fountain, inaugurated in 1982, rises on the corner of Dufferin street and Mountain boulevard. Two ponds connected by a small stream, large rock outcrops and a hilly terrain are its main geographical characteristics; its northeastern tip is fragmented by Lorne street; at its southernmost limits, the park touches Parkview, an English elementary school. In the warm months, free concerts are sometimes played in a gazebo.
 Park Miner is the second oldest park in Granby; it was given to the town by mayor Stephen Henderson Campbell Miner in 1910; today, it lies downtown and houses Piscine Miner (Miner pool), the municipal indoor public pool. A monument to the founders of Saint-Jean-Baptiste society was erected in 1934. The first community public art gallery in the region is installed by Atelier 19 to celebrate its ten years. During the summer, the park has tents installed to house different public activities such as dance and music.

Climate
Granby has a humid continental climate (Dfb). It has significant variations of temperature with four distinct seasons. Summers are warm but short and winters are very cold. Transitional seasons have significant variations of temperature between adjacent months. Precipitation is quite high, resulting in rainy summers and snowy winters.

Demographics 

In 2021, 92.5% of the population were white/European, 5.5% were visible minorities and 2.0% were Indigenous. The largest visible minority groups were Black (1.8%), Latin American (1.6%), Arab (0.8%), and West Asian (0.5%).

91.8% of residents spoke French as a mother tongue. Other common first languages were English (2.1%), Spanish (1.6%), Arabic (0.6%), and Persian languages (0.4%). 1.0% of residents listed both French and English as their mother tongues, while 0.4% listed both French and a non-official language.

69.0% of residents were Christian, down from 87.2% in 2011. 61.6% were Catholic, 4.3% were Christian n.o.s., and 1.4% were Protestant. Other Christian denominations and Christian-related traditions accounted for 1.6% of the population. Non-religious and secular people were 28.9% of the population, up from 11.3% in 2011. 2.1% of residents followed other religions, up from 1.5% in 2011. The largest non-Christian religion was Islam (1.7%).

Economy and attractions

Granby is a regional centre for industries (textile, lumber, dairy products) and commercial zone, but is also a tourist town, due to the presence of the important Granby Zoo, founded by the Mayor Horace Boivin. It hosts a Fête des Mascottes ("Mascot Festival") each year in July.

Granby is the host of the yearly "Festival de la chanson de Granby" ("Granby Song Festival") in which many well-known artists, such as Jean Leloup and Luc De Larochellière, have first gained public exposure.

The international classic car show takes place at parc Daniel-Johnston, with over 2500 antiques, vintage, hot rods, muscle cars and classic imports cars every summer.
Granby's annual classic car show

Granby is also home to the Galeries de Granby regional shopping mall which has 106 stores.

The Autodrome Granby, one of Canada's largest dirt oval racing tracks, hosts professional racing teams every Friday night from May to September. Winner of many prizes Autodrome Granby is known worldwide in the racing community.

Sports
Granby is the location of the annual Challenger Banque Nationale de Granby of the ATP Challenger Tour, which takes place at the Club de Tennis des Loisirs de Granby.

The Granby Inouk of the Quebec Junior AAA Hockey League are based in Granby. The Inouk play their home games at the Leonard Grondin Arena.

Granby is also home to the Ligue de Baseball Senior Élite du Québec's Granby Guerriers. The Guerriers play their home games at Napoléon Fontaine Stadium.

From 1981 to 1997, Granby was home to a QMJHL team, originally called the Granby Bisons but changed to the Granby Prédateurs in 1995. The team won the Memorial Cup in 1996. In 1997, the franchise relocated to Sydney, Nova Scotia and became the Cape Breton Screaming Eagles. Both teams played at Léonard Grondin Arena.

Transportation
The public transit department of the town is Transport urbain Granby. Until 1956, it was the eastern terminus of the Montreal and Southern Counties Railway's Montreal-Granby Line.

Twin towns – sister cities

Granby's twinned are:

Ancona, Italy
Bokito, Cameroon
Coventry, England
Hammam-Lif, Tunisia
Joal-Fadiouth, Senegal
Marrakech, Morocco
Rayne, United States
Windsor, Ontario

Notable people
Benoit Coulombe, scientist and researcher.
Palmer Cox, writer and illustrator of a popular series of children's books about supernatural creatures known as the Brownies, based on Scottish folklore.
Pierre-Luc Dusseault, the youngest Member of Parliament in Canadian history;
Rosie Valland, pop singer-songwriter.
Kim Thúy, writer and novelist (Vietnamese-born, childhood in Granby)

See also
List of census agglomerations by province or territory (Quebec)
Granby, Quebec (township)
List of cities in Quebec
Municipal history of Quebec
Granby Consolidated Mining, Smelting and Power Company

Notes

References

External links

Town of Granby website

 
Incorporated places in La Haute-Yamaska Regional County Municipality
Cities and towns in Quebec